Grisham Township (N⅔T7N R4W) is located in Montgomery County, Illinois, United States. As of the 2010 census, its population was 629 and it contained 318 housing units.

Geography

Demographics

Adjacent townships
 Hillsboro Township (north)
 East Fork Township (northeast & east)
 La Grange Township, Bond County (southeast)
 Shoal Creek Township, Bond County (south)
 Walshville Township (west)
 South Litchfield Township (northwest)

References

External links
City-data.com
Illinois State Archives
Historical Society of Montgomery County

Townships in Montgomery County, Illinois
Townships in Illinois